This is a list of fictional characters from DC Comics who are enemies of Firestorm.

Firestorm enemies

In alphabetical order (with issue and date of debut appearance).

 
Lists of DC Comics characters
Lists of DC Comics supervillains